Toxabramis is a genus of cyprinid fish found in eastern Asia.  There are currently seven species in this genus.

Species
 Toxabramis argentifer J. F. Abbott, 1901
 Toxabramis hoffmanni S. Y. Lin, 1934
 Toxabramis hotayensis V. H. Nguyễn, 2001
 Toxabramis houdemeri Pellegrin, 1932
 Toxabramis maensis H. D. Nguyễn & N. A. Dương, 2006
 Toxabramis nhatleensis H. D. Nguyễn, Đ. H. Trần & T. T. Tạ, 2006
 Toxabramis swinhonis Günther, 1873

References
 

 
Fish of Asia
Taxa named by Albert Günther